Lobsang Spire is a mountain in the Karakoram Range of the Gilgit-Baltistan region of Pakistan. It rises above the Baltoro Glacier near Broad Peak.

First ascent
Lobsang Spire was first climbed on 13 June 1983 by an expedition led by Doug Scott, with Greg Child and Peter Thexton, via the South Pillar and in alpine style. They climbed from 10–13 June in one of the first routes to employ big wall aid climbing techniques, including portaledges, in the Karakoram. A previous attempt by other expedition members Alan Rouse and Andy Parkin via the West ridge failed near the summit.

References 

Mountains of Gilgit-Baltistan
Karakoram